The Ministry of Urban Development is the Sri Lankan government ministry responsible for planning and implementation of Economic social and physical development of the areas declared by the Minister-in-charge of the subject of Urban development. The ministry was established by an Act of parliament bearing No 41 of 1978. The Urban Development Authority is executively functioning under this ministry that is responsible for empowering to function as the key urban planning and implementing agency of the country.

History 
The Urban Development Authority was established by Junius R. Jayewardene on 1978 under Act of Parliament bearing No 41 with a perspective to advance incorporated arranging and execution of Economic social and physical improvement of the ranges pronounced by responsible Minister-in-charge of the Urban Development.

Departments 
 Urban Development Authority Mr. Nimesh Herath is the current Chairman of the Urban Development Authority of Sri Lanka. 
 Ministry of Urban Development & Housing.
 Sri Lanka Land Reclamation and Development Corporation and its subsidiaries headed by M. H. M. Salman.
 National Water Supply and its subsidiaries headed by K. Alahudeen Ansar
 Department of National Community Water Supply''' and its subsidiaries headed by Eng.Karunasena Hettiarachchi

Ministers 
Parties

References

External links
 Urban Development Authority
 National Water Supply & Drainage
 

 
Urban Development
Urban Development
Urban development ministries